Wyoming Highway 294 (WYO 294) is a  southeast-northwest Wyoming state road located in northeastern Park County between U.S. Route 14 Alternate (US 14 Alt.) and WYO 120.

Route description
Wyoming Highway 294 begins its southern end at US 14A (Powell Highway) near the community (CDP) of Ralston, approximately 8 miles southwest of Powell. Highway 294, named Badger Basin Road, begins its journey northward crossing the Garland Canal at three-tenths of a mile before passing west of the Ralston Reservoir. WYO 294 continues northwesterly through the remote regions of northeast Park County, reaching its northern terminus at Wyoming Highway 120 near the Unincorporated community of Clark  later.

Major intersections

References

External links 
Wyoming State Routes 200-299
WYO 294 - US 14A to WYO 120
Wyoming Highway 294 Picture

Transportation in Park County, Wyoming
294